Hammerberg is a family name. Notable people with it include:

 Billie Hammerberg (1936–1995), Australian actress
 Francis P. Hammerberg (1920–1945), American naval diver
 Traci Hammerberg (1966–1984), American murder victim

See also 

 USS Hammerberg